List of chairmen of the Parliament of North Ossetia–Alania.

This is a list of chairmen (speakers) of the Supreme Council:

This is a list of chairmen (speakers) of the Parliament of the Republic of North Ossetia–Alania:

Sources

Lists of legislative speakers in Russia
Chairmen